Hugh Dugan is an American academic and diplomat who served as the acting Special Envoy for Hostage Affairs from October 4, 2019 to March 1, 2020.

Education 
Dugan earned a Bachelor of Science in Foreign Service from the School of Foreign Service at Georgetown University, Master of Arts from the Fletcher School of Law and Diplomacy at Tufts University, and MBA from the Wharton School of the University of Pennsylvania. He was also a State Department Fellow at the International Olympic Academy.

Career 
During Dugan's career in the United States Foreign Service, he served as an advisor to 11 United States Ambassadors to the United Nations. After the September 11 attacks, he was recruited to serve as a staffer on the United States Senate Committee on Foreign Relations’s Subcommittee on International Operations and Terrorism. Dugan also served in the Bureau of Economic and Business Affairs, the American Consulate General in Bermuda, and the Embassy of the United States, Mexico City. Dugan has worked as a visiting scholar at Seton Hall University.

From January 28, 2019 to April 27, 2020, Dugan served as the Principal Deputy Special Envoy for Hostage Affairs. He concurrently served as acting Special Envoy from October 2019 to March 2020. In February 2020, Trump appointed Dugan to serve as a member of the United States National Security Council.

Dugan is the founder of the Truce Foundation, a non-profit organization based in Princeton, New Jersey that advocates for fostering diplomatic relationships through sport, modeled after the Olympic Truce.

References 

Living people
The Fletcher School at Tufts University alumni
Walsh School of Foreign Service alumni
Wharton School of the University of Pennsylvania alumni
United States Special Envoys
United States Department of State officials
Trump administration personnel
Seton Hall University faculty
Year of birth missing (living people)